Oru Maravathoor Kanavu is a 1998 Malayalam comedy-drama musical film directed by Lal Jose and written by Sreenivasan. It stars Mammootty, Biju Menon, Mohini, Divya Unni, Sreenivasan, Kalabhavan Mani, Sukumari and Nedumudi Venu. The music was composed by Vidyasagar.
 
It was the directorial debut of Lal Jose, who had previously worked as an assistant director in many Malayalam films. Playback singer Devanand also debuted through this film. The film was a box-office success. The core plot of the movie is based on the 1986 French movie Jean de Florette.

Plot
Michael, his wife Mary and their son buy a farmland in Maravathoor that was coveted by a rich man named Palanichamy. In order to drive away all prospective buyers, Palanichamy and his nephew Maruthu try everything. When they realise that Michael has bought the farm, they block up a spring water source on the farm to make things hard for Michael and thus force him to sell the farm.

Michael and his family stay at the house of Annie and her grandmother, while they work on the farm. The farm struggles due to the lack of availability of water, and due to Michael's vices (gambling and alcoholism). To support Michael, his brother Chandy comes to Maravathoor. Chandy is an active party worker in Southern Kerala and acts as a muscle for his party's needs. His arrival changes the fortunes of the farm and halts the activities of Palanichamy.

To support Chandy's activities, Antappan and friends (party workers/goons) arrives as well from Chandy's hometown. To eliminate Chandy's threat, Palanichamy spreads a rumour of an illicit relationship between Michael's wife, Mary and Chandy. Evil plans of the rich man comes to a fruition when one morning Maravathoor wakes to the news that Chandy and Mary have run away together.

The movie ends with Chandy coming back to bury his deceased brother Michael and has to face the wrath of his nephew and the villagers. He explains that he left that day earlier because the leader of his political party, Korah Sir has died. Later Michael comes to see Chandy and says under the influence of Alcohol he gambled away his money and accidentally caused the death of his wife. Michael tells about the rumor that's been passing around the village and Chandy comforts Michael not to worry - Let the rumor stay as it is. He gives the replies to the letters that he received from Michael to Michael's son which in turn proves Chandy's innocence. The scandal is resolved and Chandy finds his home again in Maravathoor.

Cast

Soundtrack
The soundtrack features seven songs composed by Vidyasagar, with lyrics by Gireesh Puthenchery.

Box office
The film was both commercial and critical success.It had a 150 days theatrical run.

References

External links
 
 Oru Maravathoor Kanavu at the Malayalam Movie Database

1990s Malayalam-language films
1998 comedy-drama films
1998 films
Films scored by Vidyasagar
Films directed by Lal Jose
Indian remakes of French films
Films shot in Pollachi
1998 directorial debut films